Luan may refer to:

Places 
 Lu'an, a city in Anhui, China
 Luan County, Hebei, China
 Luan River, Hebei, China

Other uses
 Luan (surname), a Chinese surname
 Luan (mythology), a legendary bird in Chinese mythology
 Trees in the genus Shorea, sometimes known as Philippine mahogany
 Plywood, made from luan trees and others in the family Dipterocarpaceae

People with the given name

Men 
 Luan (footballer, born 1987) (Luan Bueno), Brazilian footballer
 Luan Capanni (born 2000), Brazilian footballer
 Luan Chagas (born 1989), Brazilian mixed martial artist
 Luan (footballer, born 1990) (Luan Madson Gedeão de Paiva), Brazilian footballer
 Luan Qerimi (1929–2018), Albanian actor
 Luan Santos (footballer, born 1991), Brazilian footballer
 Luan (footballer, born March 1993) (Luan Vieira), Brazilian footballer
 Luan (footballer, born May 1993) (Luan da Conceição Silva), Brazilian footballer
 Luan (footballer, born 1996) (Luan Leite da Silva), Brazilian footballer
 Luan (footballer, born 1999) (Luan Vinícius da Silva Santos), Brazilian footballer

Women 
 Luan Gabriel (born 1996), Dominican sprinter
 Luan Parle, Irish musician, songwriter, and producer
 Luan Peters (1946–2017), British actress and singer, born Carol Hirsch
 Luan Zhengrong (born 1974), Chinese cross-country skier
 Luan Zhili (born 1973), Chinese discus thrower

Characters 
 Luan Volien Abbott, a character on the soap opera The Young and the Restless
 Luan Loud, a character in the American animated series The Loud House
 Luan, a character in Shovel Knight: Specter of Torment

See also
Lauan (disambiguation)
Luana (disambiguation)
 Luand'r, a DC Comics character
Luane Dy, Filipino actress and TV host
"Luanne", a song by Foreigner from the album 4

Unisex given names
Albanian masculine given names
Brazilian given names